Lycium australe, the Australian boxthorn, is a native Australian plant with large sharp woody spines, small leaves and very small berries. It is closely related to Lycium ferocissimum (African boxthorn), which is listed as an invasive weed in Australia, New Zealand and Cyprus.

It is possible to differentiate between these two species using the following features:

Distribution
Lycium australe is endemic to the mainland of Australia, and is found in New South Wales, Victoria, South Australia  and Western Australia.

Habitat
This plant grows in arid and semi-arid areas, in subsaline soils at the edges of claypans and salt lakes.

Taxonomy and naming
The plant was first described by Ferdinand von Mueller in 1859, and its specific epithet, australe, comes from the Latin adjective, australis, -is, -e, ("south/southern"), thus describing the plant as coming from the southern hemisphere. It has no synonyms.

References

External links
Lycium australe occurrence data from the Australasian Virtual Herbarium
GBIF:Lycium australe occurrence data & images
 

australe
Taxa named by Ferdinand von Mueller
Plants described in 1859
Flora of South Australia
Flora of New South Wales
Eudicots of Western Australia
Flora of Victoria (Australia)